Nawang Suksawit School (also known as Nawang Education School) (commonly called: Nawangwit)() is a large secondary school in the Nong Bua Lamphu Province of Thailand. It is in the Wang Saen Suwan campus. Under the Office of the Secondary Educational Service Area Office 19.

History 

Nawang Suksawit School is a high school of Na Wang District, Nong Bua Lamphu was formerly known as Naklang Suksawit School, Naklang District, Udonthani Province. Established on March 30, 1978. First opened in May 1978. There are 120 students, 4 teachers have been allocated. Mr. Peerapol Srilao is the principal teacher. The area is generally sloping from the west to the east. The area is mostly clay, clay, clay. It is a cultivation problem. Area Reclamation And the water is very strong. The first term in Udon Thani. The school is located in Tambon Na lao, Naklang District, Udon Thani Province. First, use a delicious home is a place to teach. The first school building is The Inthanin Building was completed in 1980, followed by Ratchaphruek Building. Until the academic year 2535 approved by the Ministry of Education to teach in the secondary school. Then in 1993, on the west side of Udon Thani, which is adjacent to Loei Province. Nongbua Lamphu District, Suwannakhuha District Sriboonrueng District And noonsang district. It was declared as Nong Bua Lam Phu Province on December 1, 1993, published in the Government Gazette Vol. 110, Part 125, dated September 2, 1993. Nawang Suksawit School is located in the district. Nongbua Lamphu province Until April 30, 2537, the Ministry of Interior announced the five districts of the district of Naklang district, namely, Thep Kiri, Nalao, Nakae, Wang Thong and Wang Plapom. Raised as a semi-district Na Wang. The school was renamed after the name of the district in those days. Nawang Suksawit School Due to the increasing number of students from high school students Secondary school is Na Wang district. Therefore, it was approved to build a new school building, Leelawadee Building, in the year 2538 to support the expansion of the school will occur in the future. Then in 2003, the school was selected by the Ministry of Education as a school in one district one school in dream of Na Wang District, Nongbua Lamphu province. This is a remarkable project of educational reform of the government in those days.

With the potential and quality of the various schools of Na Wang Education, the school has become an important source of learning in Na Wang district. And received many awards at the provincial level. Northeast and national level

With the cooperation of teachers and students, the school has become more popular in Nong Bua Lamphu. Nawang Suksawit School is also selected. School of Development Leadership in ASEAN Community of Nong Bua Lamphu Province. The development of education in any district. The school past Nawang Suksawit School. It can not be done alone. It is important to rely on and get support from all sectors to be successful, such as the Alumni Association Nawang Suksawit School, Tonkla Nawangwit club, Na Wang Hospital, a teacher and students in Na Wang District.

At Present, Nawang Suksawit School is located at 55 Moo 13, Udon Than - Loei Road, Tambon Nalao, Nawang District, Nong Bua Lamphu Province. There are 3 school buildings, 4 operating buildings, 1 temporary building and one main hall. The school has a total area of over 14 rais. The school director is Mr. Pisit Shinchaipong. School distance from the school to the provincial center 42 km.

Course 
Nawang Suksawit School has developed a curriculum based on the Basic Education Curriculum BE 2551, a core curriculum for both compulsory and core curriculum. Also included is the school's curriculum management. Military students From 1st to 3rd year

Junior high school level

High school level

Director names

O-NET average  
This is O-NET average of Nawang Suksawit School in 5 Basic Subject. They are Math, Science, Social study, English and Thai language. This is the national test of grade 12 in secondary level.

School premises 
 Sattaban Hall
 Building 1 Inthanin
 Building 2 Ratchaphruek
 Building 3 Leelavadee
 Kahakam Building
 Autsahakam Building
 Kasettakam Building
 Sillapa Building
 Imaroy Food Building
 Dome 39 years Nawang Suksawit School
 Sillapa Art Garden
 Nangphomhom Garden
 Motorcycle Dome
 Welfare Shop
 Tennis Court
 Football Field
 Activities Floor

Orthur 
Website of Nawangsuksawit School
Website of The Secondary Education Area office 19
Facebook Fanpage

References 

 http://data.bopp-obec.info/emis/schooldata-view_bobec.php?School_ID=1039760346&Area_CODE=101719
 http://data.bopp-obec.info/web/index.php?School_ID=1039760346

Secondary schools in Thailand
Schools in Nong Bua Lamphu Province